Aiken County  is a county in the U.S. state of South Carolina. As of the 2020 census, its population was 168,808. Its county seat and largest city is Aiken. Aiken County is a part of the Augusta-Richmond County, GA-SC Metropolitan Statistical Area. It is mostly in the Sandhills region, with the northern parts reaching in the Piedmont and southern parts reaching into the Coastal Plain.

History
In the colonial era the area that is now Aiken County was part of Edgefield and Orangeburgh Districts. The majority of the population were immigrant farmers.
Most of whom were from the rural parts of Lincolnshire, England; however, very few were from the town of Lincoln. Virtually all of the farmers from Lincolnshire came to the colony as indentured servants in the 1730s and 1740s. However, by the 1750s, almost all of the Lincolnshire settlers in what is now Aiken County were living on their own private land, almost exclusively engaging in subsistence agriculture on smallholding farms. Many immigrants also came from the rural eastern half of the English county of Nottinghamshire. Specifically, many indentured servants came from the towns of Newark-on-Trent, Winthorpe, Coddington, Balderton, Kelham and Farndon. A third group of English farmers settled in the colony, mostly arriving not as individual indentured servants but as entire family units, coming from the Derbyshire Dales region of the English county of Derbyshire; these settlers primarily originated in the three towns of Ashbourne, Bakewell and Matlock as well as the farm country surrounding these towns.  These settlers also settled on lands in between the Savannah River in the west and the towns of Berlin and Jones Crossroads in the east, all arriving in what has since become Aiken County in the 1740s.  A numerically smaller but influential migration came to what has since become Aiken County in the form of Presbyterian immigrants of Scottish ancestry who came from County Antrim and the northern portion of County Down in Ireland, as well as small numbers from the town of Kesh in County Fermanagh, Ireland. This population referred to themselves as "Ulstermen" and "Irish Presbyterians" but were known in the colonies as "Scots-Irish" settlers, though this was not a term they self-applied.  They too arrived in the 1740s. The area that has since become Aiken County had a significantly high number of first generation British immigrants who fought for the Patriot cause in the revolutionary war.

Both Aiken County and its county seat of Aiken are named after William Aiken (1779–1831), the first president of the South Carolina Railroad Company. Aiken County was organized during the Reconstruction era in 1871 from portions of Barnwell, Edgefield, Lexington, and Orangeburg counties.

Prince Rivers, a freedman and state legislator from Edgefield County, had been a leader in the United States Colored Troops. He was named to head the commission that drew the new county's boundary lines. He was dubbed "The Black Prince" by local newspapers, including the Edgefield Advertiser. He also led the commission that selected the site of Aiken County's present-day courthouse. Other freedmen who were part of the founding of the county were Samuel J. Lee, speaker of the state House and the first black man admitted to the South Carolina Bar; and Charles D. Hayne, a free man of color from one of Charleston's elite families.

Political tensions kept rising in South Carolina during the 1870s, especially around elections. In the months before the 1876 elections, Aiken County was one of the areas to suffer white paramilitary Red Shirts attacks and violence directed against black Republicans to suppress the black vote. Between the Hamburg Massacre in July and several days of rioting in September in Ellenton, more than 100 black men were killed by white paramilitary groups in this county. Two white men died in the violence.

In the late 19th century, the county became a popular winter refuge for affluent Northerners, who built luxury housing. The county remains popular with horse trainers and professional riders because mild winters allow lengthy training seasons.

In the 1950s, Aiken County (along with the nearby counties of Allendale and Barnwell) was chosen as the location for storage and production of nuclear materials and various fissile materials, now known as the Savannah River Site. Ellenton, South Carolina was acquired and its buildings demolished for its development of this plant. Its residents and businesses were moved north about eight miles to New Ellenton, and about 5 miles south to the town of Jackson just outside the entrance to the Savannah River Site, Developed during Cold War tensions, the facility is scheduled for decommissioning of various parts of the site.

Geography

It is the fourth-largest county in South Carolina by land area.

State and local protected areas/sites 
 Aiken Gopher Tortoise Heritage Preserve/Wildlife Management Area
 Aiken State Park
 Audubon's Silver Bluff Center and Sanctuary
 Britton Mims Place
 Battle of Aiken
 Graniteville Historic District
 Henderson Heritage Preserve/ Wildlife Management Area
 Redcliffe Plantation State Historic Site
 Vaucluse Mill Village Historic District

Major water bodies 
 Bridge Creek
 Morris Lake
 North Fork Edisto River
 South Fork Edisto River
 Savannah River
 Shaw Creek

Adjacent counties
 Saluda County - north
 Lexington County - northeast
 Orangeburg County - east
 Barnwell County - south
 Burke County, Georgia - southwest
 Edgefield County - west
 Richmond County, Georgia - west

Major highways

Major infrastructure 
 Aiken Regional Airport
 Harman Airport (SC20)
 Savannah River Site (part)

Demographics

2020 census

As of the 2020 United States census, there were 168,808 people, 67,889 households, and 43,932 families residing in the county.

2010 census
As of the 2010 United States Census, there were 160,099 people, 64,253 households, and 43,931 families living in the county. The racial makeup of the county was 69.6% white, 24.6% black or African American, 0.8% Asian, 0.4% American Indian, 2.6% from other races, and 1.9% from two or more races. Those of Hispanic or Latino origin made up 4.9% of the population. In terms of ancestry, 20.6% were American, 10.0% were English, 9.9% were German, and 8.6% were Irish.

Of the 64,253 households, 31.4% had children under the age of 18 living with them, 49.3% were married couples living together, 14.4% had a female householder with no husband present, 31.6% were non-families, and 26.9% of all households were made up of individuals. The average household size was 2.45 and the average family size was 2.96. The median age was 40.0 years.

The median income for a household in the county was $44,468 and the median income for a family was $57,064. Males had a median income of $44,436 versus $33,207 for females. The per capita income for the county was $24,172. About 13.4% of families and 16.6% of the population were below the poverty line, including 23.7% of those under age 18 and 13.3% of those age 65 or over.

The following is from the 2010 Census Total Population : 160,099 (100.00%)

Population by Race
American Indian and Alaska native alone 682 (0.43%)
Asian alone 1,329 (0.83%)
Black or African American alone 39,354 (24.58%)
Native Hawaiian and Other Pacific native alone 61 (0.04%)
Some other race alone 4,126 (2.58%)
Two or more races 3,090 (1.93%)
White alone     111,457 (69.62%)

Population by Hispanic or Latino Origin (of any race)
Persons Not of Hispanic or Latino Origin 152,275 (95.11%)
Persons of Hispanic or Latino Origin 7,824 (4.89%)

Population by Gender
Female 82,549 (51.56%)
Male 77,550 (48.44%)

Population by Age
Persons 0 to 4 years 10,046 (6.27%)
Persons 5 to 17 years 26,782 (16.73%)
Persons 18 to 64 years (98,652) 61.62%
Persons 65 years and over 24,619 (15.38%)

2000 census
As of the census of 2000, there were 142,552 people, 55,587 households, and 39,411 families living in the county. There were 61,987 housing units at an average density of 58 per square mile (22/km2). The racial makeup of the county was 71.37% White, 25.56% Black or African American, 0.40% Native American, 0.63% Asian, 0.03% Pacific Islander, and 1.18% from two or more races. 2.12% of the population were Hispanic or Latino of any race. 22.0% were of American, 9.7% English, 8.4% German and 7.9% Irish ancestry according to Census 2000.

There were 55,587 households, out of which 33.10% had children under the age of 18 living with them, 53.30% were married couples living together, 13.80% had a female householder with no husband present, and 29.10% were non-families. 25.20% of all households were made up of individuals, and 9.20% had someone living alone who was 65 years of age or older. The average household size was 2.53 and the average family size was 3.03.

In the county, the population was spread out, with 26.20% under the age of 18, 8.80% from 18 to 24, 28.90% from 25 to 44, 23.30% from 45 to 64, and 12.80% who were 65 years of age or older. The median age was 36 years. For every 100 females, there were 92.90 males. For every 100 females age 18 and over, there were 89.20 males.

The median income for a household in the county was $37,889, and the median income for a family was $45,769. Males had a median income of $36,743 versus $23,810 for females. The per capita income for the county was $18,772. About 10.60% of families and 13.80% of the population were below the poverty line, including 18.90% of those under age 18 and 12.50% of those age 65 or over.

Law and government
Gary Bunker is the Chairman of the Aiken County Council. The other members and their districts are as follows:
 Kathy Rawls- District 1
 Camille Furgiuele - District 2
 Danny Feagin - District 3
 Chuck Smith- District 4
 Sandy Haskell- District 5
 Phil Napier - District 6
 Andrew Siders - District 7
 Willar H. Hightower Jr.- District 8
 Mike Hunt- Aiken County Sheriff

Politics
Aiken County has long been a Republican stronghold, not supporting even southern Democrats Lyndon Johnson of Texas, Jimmy Carter of Georgia, Bill Clinton of Arkansas or Al Gore of Tennessee. However, it has trended more liberal in recent years, giving Bob Dole in 1996 a greater proportion of the vote than Donald Trump in 2016, despite Dole losing decisively to Bill Clinton nationally, and Donald Trump narrowly winning the Electoral College.

Education
Aiken County Public School District, Aiken Technical College, University of South Carolina Aiken are located in Aiken County.

Communities

Cities
 Aiken (county seat and largest city)
 New Ellenton
 North Augusta (partly in Edgefield County)

Towns
 Burnettown
 Jackson
 Perry
 Salley
 Monetta (partly in Saluda County)
 Wagener
 Windsor

Census-designated places
 Belvedere
 Clearwater
 Gloverville
 Graniteville
 Langley
 Warrenville

Unincorporated communities
 Bath
 Beech Island
 Eureka
 New Holland
 Seivern
 Spiderweb
 Talatha
 White Pond
 Vaucluse

Historic places
 Aiken Tennis Club
 Hamburg
 Whitehall
 Palmetto Golf Club
 Whitney Field, Polo, Oldest in United States
 Hitchcock Woods

See also
 List of counties in South Carolina
 National Register of Historic Places listings in Aiken County, South Carolina
 South Carolina State Parks
 Horse Creek Valley
 Beaver Creek Indian Tribe, state-recognized tribe that resides in the county

References

External links

 
 
 Aiken County history and images

 
Augusta metropolitan area
1871 establishments in South Carolina